Warring is a surname. Notable people with the surname include:

 James Warring (born 1958), American boxer
 Kahale Warring (born 1997), American football player
 Lynne Warring (born 1963), New Zealand footballer get
//: Nicky. ESTAS momentos social and bio WAR .....

See also
 Waring